Hexane is an organic compound, a straight-chain alkane with six carbon atoms and has the molecular formula C6H14.

It is widely used as a cheap, relatively safe, largely unreactive, and easily evaporated non-polar solvent, and modern gasoline blends contain about 3% hexane.

The term hexanes refers to a mixture, composed largely (>60%) of hexane, with varying amounts of the isomeric compounds 2-methylpentane and 3-methylpentane, and, possibly, smaller amounts of nonisomeric C5, C6, and C7 (cyclo)alkanes. These hexanes are cheaper than pure hexane and are often used in large-scale operations not requiring a single isomer (e.g., as cleaning solvent or for chromatography).

Isomers

Uses
In industry, hexanes are used in the formulation of glues for shoes, leather products, and roofing. They are also used to extract cooking oils (such as canola oil or soy oil) from seeds, for cleansing and degreasing a variety of items, and in textile manufacturing.  They are commonly used in food based soybean oil extraction in the United States, and are potentially present as contaminants in all soy food products in which the technique is used; the lack of regulation by the FDA of this contaminant is a matter of some controversy.

A typical laboratory use of hexanes is to extract oil and grease contaminants from water and soil for analysis. Since hexane cannot be easily deprotonated, it is used in the laboratory for reactions that involve very strong bases, such as the preparation of organolithiums. For example, butyllithiums are typically supplied as a hexane solution.

Hexanes are commonly used in chromatography as a non-polar solvent. Higher alkanes present as impurities in hexanes have similar retention times as the solvent, meaning that fractions containing hexane will also contain these impurities. In preparative chromatography, concentration of a large volume of hexanes can result in a sample that is appreciably contaminated by alkanes. This may result in a solid compound being obtained as an oil and the alkanes may interfere with analysis.

Production
Hexanes are chiefly obtained by refining crude oil. The exact composition of the fraction depends largely on the source of the oil (crude or reformed) and the constraints of the refining.

Physical properties
All alkanes are colorless. The boiling points of the various hexanes are somewhat similar and, as for other alkanes, are generally lower for the more branched forms. The melting points are quite different and the trend is not apparent.

Hexane has considerable vapor pressure at room temperature:

Reactivity
Like most alkanes, hexane characteristically exhibits low reactivity and are suitable solvents for reactive compounds.  Commercial samples of n-hexane however often contains methylcyclopentane, which features tertiary C-H bonds, which are incompatible with some radical reactions.

Safety 
Inhalation of n-hexane at 5000 ppm for 10 minutes produces marked vertigo; 2500-1000 ppm for 12 hours produces drowsiness, fatigue, loss of appetite, and paresthesia in the distal extremities; 2500–5000 ppm produces muscle weakness, cold pulsation in the extremities, blurred vision, headache and anorexia. Chronic occupational exposure to elevated levels of n-hexane has been demonstrated to be associated with peripheral neuropathy in auto mechanics in the US, and neurotoxicity in workers in printing presses, and shoe and furniture factories in Asia, Europe, and North America.

The US National Institute for Occupational Safety and Health (NIOSH) has set a recommended exposure limit (REL) for hexane isomers (not n-hexane) of 100 ppm over an 8-hour workday. However, for n-hexane, the current NIOSH REL is 50 ppm over an 8-hour workday. This limit was proposed as a permissible exposure limit (PEL) by the Occupational Safety and Health Administration in 1989; however, this PEL was overruled in US courts in 1992. The current n-hexane PEL in the US is 500 ppm.

Hexane and other volatile hydrocarbons (petroleum ether) present an aspiration risk. n-Hexane is sometimes used as a denaturant for alcohol, and as a cleaning agent in the textile, furniture, and leather industries. It is slowly being replaced with other solvents.

Like gasoline, hexane is highly volatile and is an explosion risk. Ignition of hexane vapors which had been illegally discharged in the sewers of Louisville (Kentucky) from a soybean processing plant owned by Ralston-Purina caused a series of explosions which destroyed over 21 km of sewer lines and streets in that city.

Incidents
Occupational hexane poisoning has occurred with Japanese sandal workers, Italian shoe workers, Taiwan press proofing workers, and others. Analysis of Taiwanese workers has shown occupational exposure to substances including n-hexane. In 2010–2011, Chinese workers manufacturing iPhones were reported to have suffered hexane poisoning.

Hexane was identified as being the cause of the Louisville sewer explosions on 13 February 1981, that destroyed more than 13 miles (21 km) of sewer lines and streets in the center of Louisville in Kentucky, United States and it was attributed as the cause of an explosion that occurred in the National University of Río Cuarto, Argentina on 5 December 2007, due to a hexane spill near a heat-producing machine that exploded and produced a fire that killed one student and injured 24 more.

Biotransformation
n-Hexane is biotransformed to 2-hexanol and further to 2,5-hexanediol in the body.  The conversion is catalyzed by the enzyme cytochrome P450 utilizing oxygen from air. 2,5-Hexanediol may be further oxidized to 2,5-hexanedione, which is neurotoxic and produces a polyneuropathy. In view of this behavior, replacement of n-hexane as a solvent has been discussed.   n-Heptane is a possible alternative.

See also
Cyclohexane

References

External links
International Chemical Safety Card 1262 (2-methylpentane)
Material Safety Data Sheet for Hexane
National Pollutant Inventory – n-hexane fact sheet

Phytochemica l database entry
Center for Disease Control and Prevention

Warning from National Safety Council "COMMON CHEMICAL AFFECTS AUTO MECHANICS"
Australian National Pollutant Inventory (NPI) page
"EPA does not consider n-hexane classifiable as a human carcinogen." Federal Register / Vol. 66, No. 71 / Thursday, 12 April 2001 / Rules and Regulations

Alkanes
Hazardous air pollutants
Hydrocarbon solvents
Commodity chemicals